The Willing Flesh (1955) (English translation published 1956) is a novel by Willi Heinrich, chronicling the Eastern Front combat experiences of a depleted infantry platoon during the 1943 German retreat from the Taman Peninsula in the Caucasian coast of Russia.

In the United States, the novel was published in 1956 by Bobbs-Merrill Company under the title Cross of Iron.  Thus the 1977 Hollywood film directed by Sam Peckinpah used this title.

Historical basis
The literary and cinematic "Sergeant Steiner" character may be based upon Johann Schwerdfeger (b. 24 November 1914, in Plein bei Wittlich) who soldiered from 1935 to 1937 in Infanterie Regiment 84, and in 1939 was transferred to the Third Company of Infanterie Regiment 186 of the 73rd Infantry Division, at the Polish Campaign's start.

In June 1942, after serving in Jägerersatzbataillon 75, Schwerdfeger joined Jäger Regiment 228 of the 101st Jäger Division, who fought in the Don Bend, at Rostov, and at Maykop, in the Caucasus, and joined the retreat through the Kuban and the Taman Peninsula, the setting of the novel Das Geduldige Fleisch (The Willing Flesh).

On 17 May 1943, Feldwebel Schwerdfeger was awarded the Knight's Cross as a platoon leader in the First Company. In April 1944, in the breakout from Hube's Pocket, he was severely wounded, and was awarded Oak Leaves for his Knight's Cross on 14 May 1944; moreover, Sergeant Schwerdfelger also earned two tank destruction badges.

In two passages of The Willing Flesh (the novel's English edition), Meyer tells Stransky that Steiner saved Lieutenant Colonel Brandt's life; in the original German edition, "Meyer" is named "Schäfer", and "Brandt" is named "Strauss".

From The Willing Flesh (Cross of Iron), in English:

During the war, a similar action occurred to the First Battalion of the 228th Jäger Regiment. Two German military history books about that division chronicle how one of the battalion's companies was surprised and pinned down by two Russian regiments and eleven tanks of the 296 Division, who had crossed the Donets River the night of 19–20 May 1942.

Characters

The Platoon

 Feldwebel Rolf Steiner
 Unteroffizier Krüger
 Obergefreiter Karl 'Schnurrbart' Reisenauer
 Private Dorn
 Private Hollerbach
 Private Pasternack
 Private Dietz
 Private Kern
 Private Zoll
 Private Maag
 Private Anselm

High Command

 Lieutenant-Colonel Brandt (regimental commander)
 Captain Stransky (battalion commander)
 Captain Kiesel (regimental adjutant)
 Lieutenant Meyer (company commander)
 Lieutenant Gausser
 Lieutenant Triebig (battalion adjutant)

1955 German novels
German-language novels
Novels set during World War II
Novels set in Russia
German novels adapted into films